Pohl is a German surname of several possible origins.

Notable people with the surname include:

XVI−XIX centuries
David Pohl (or Pohle; 1624–1695), German composer of the Baroque era
Johann Baptist Emanuel Pohl (1782–1834), Austrian botanist
Johann Ehrenfried Pohl (1746–1800), German botanist and physician

XIX century

Arts and entertainment
Anton Carl Ferdinand Pohl (1819–1887), German-Austrian music historian, archivist, and composer
Richard Pohl (1826–1896), German composer and music author
Franz Pohl (1864–1920), outsider artist 
Joseph Pohl (1864–1939), German botanical artist
Adolph Joseph Pohl (1872–1930), Austrian artist and academic sculptor 
Klaus Pohl (1883–1958), Austrian film actor
Max Pohl (1885–1935), Austrian stage and film actor
Hermine "Hertha" Pohl (1889–1954), German writer
Frederick J. Pohl (1889–1991), American playwright, literary critic, editor, and author

Science
Julius Pohl (1861–1942), Austrian-German pharmacologist
Esther Pohl Lovejoy (1869–1967), American physician and public health pioneer
Robert Wichard Pohl (1884–1976), German physicist

Sports, military, and other
Caroline Pohl (1851–1908), brothel proprietor and local identity of the Little Lon district in Melbourne, Australia
Hugo von Pohl (1855–1916), German admiral
Oswald Pohl (1892–1951), German SS officer executed for war crimes
Maximilian Ritter von Pohl (1893–1951), German army and air force (Luftwaffe) officer
Erich Pohl (1894–1948), German international footballer

XX century

Arts and entertainment
Anna Neethling-Pohl (1906–1992), South African actress, performer and film producer
Louis Pohl (1915–1999), American artist
Frederik Pohl (1919–2013), American science fiction writer
Witta Pohl (1937–2011), German actress

Science
Herbert A. Pohl (Herbert Ackland, 1916–1986), discoverer of dielectrophoretic cell separation technology
Erika Pohl-Ströher (1919–2016), German business executive, heiress, and collector of minerals 
William Francis Pohl (1937–1988), American mathematician

Sportspeople
Herbert Pohl (1916–2010), German international footballer
Leonhard Pohl (1929–2014), German athlete
Ernest Pohl (1932–1995), Polish football (soccer) player

Other
Hermann Pohl (fl. 1910–1930), member of the Thule Society and the founder of the Germanenorden, ariosophic lodge in c. 1910–1930
Reynaldo Galindo Pohl (1918–2012), Salvadoran lawyer and diplomat
Karl Otto Pohl (1929–2015), German economist and Bundesbank head
Gerhard Pohl (1937–2012), German politician

Living people
Jürgen Pohl (born 1964), German politician
Ines Pohl (b. 1967), German journalist
James L. Pohl (fl. 1978–), American lawyer and officer in the United States Army

Arts and entertainment
Kalle Pohl (1951), German comedian and actor
Emily Pohl-Weary (1973), Canadian novelist, poet and university professor
Lucie Pohl (1983), German-American actress and stand-up comedian
Markus Pohl (fl. 2005–), German musician and member of the German power metal band Mystic Prophecy

Historians
Manfred Pohl (1944), German business historian
Sabine Bergmann-Pohl (1946), German politician
Walter Pohl (1953), Austrian historian and author
 (1964), German historian

Scientists and engineers
Robert Otto Pohl (1929), German-American physicist
Dieter Pohl (physicist) (1938), German/Swiss physicist
Peter Pohl (1940), Swedish writer and mathematician
Heinz-Dieter Pohl (1942), Austrian linguist
Klaus Pohl (computer scientist) (1960), German professor of software systems engineering
Jason Pohl (1981), chopper designer

Sportspeople

Ball sports
Danny Joe Pohl (1955), American professional golfer
Carsten Pohl (1965), German professional basketball coach
Stephanie Pohl (1978), German beach volleyball player
Shannon Pohl (1980), American badminton player
Martin Pohl (1981), German former footballer 
Jannik Pohl (1996), Danish football forward

Ice hockey
John Pohl (1979), American professional ice hockey player
Kristin Elizabeth "Krissy" Wendell-Pohl (1981), American women's ice hockey player
Petr Pohl (1986), Czech professional ice hockey player
Patrick Pohl (1990), German professional ice hockey forward

Swimmers
Marlies Pohl (1955), German former swimmer
Stefan Pohl (1978), German former swimmer

Other types of sport
Günther Pohl (1939), German long-distance and ultramarathon runner
Klaus-Jürgen Pohl (1941), German former wrestler
Hans-Peter Pohl (1965), German former winter sports athlete and Olympic skier in the Nordic combined discipline
Stephanie Gaumnitz (née Pohl; 1987), German retired racing cyclist
Michael Pohl (1989), German athlete

Other uses
Ernest Pohl Stadium, also called Górnik Zabrze Stadium, a multi-purpose stadium in Zabrze, Poland, named for Ernest Pohl

See also
Pöhl
Pohl commutator
Pohlman
von Pohl
Pohle (disambiguation)
Pole (disambiguation)
Poll (disambiguation)

References

German-language surnames
Ethnonymic surnames